General elections will be held in Fiji by 2026 to elect members of the eighth Parliament under the 2013 constitution.

Background
The 2022 general elections resulted in a hung parliament. Although FijiFirst emerged as the largest party, a coalition government was formed by the People's Alliance (led by Sitiveni Rabuka) with the National Federation Party and the Social Democratic Liberal Party (SODELPA). This coalition has also began somewhat friendly relations with other parties such as the Fiji Labour Party, which signed a memorandum of understanding with the Freedom Alliance and the Unity Party.

Following the coalition's victory, members from all three parties were given ministerial positions in the Cabinet. Due to this, there are three Deputy Prime Ministers; Manoa Kamikamica (People's Alliance), Biman Prasad (NFP) and Bill Gavoka (SODELPA).

On 17 February 2023, Bainimarama was suspended from Parliament for three years after making offensive comments about President Wiliame Katonivere and Prime Minister Sitiveni Rabuka, along with making seditious statements in breach of standing orders. On 8 March 2023, he resigned from Parliament and as Opposition Leader, being arrested and charged with breach of office the next day. He was replaced as Opposition Leader by Inia Seruiratu.

References

Notes

Future elections in Oceania
Elections in Fiji